The Department of Homeland Security Appropriations Act, 2014 is an appropriations bill that was introduced into the United States House of Representatives during the 114th United States Congress. The bill would appropriate money to various government agencies (primarily, but not exclusively) related to the United States Department of Homeland Security. This funding would be used during fiscal year 2015, which ends September 30, 2015.

United States Department of Homeland Security
Acts of the 114th United States Congress
United States federal appropriations legislation